The Dogway Melody is a 1930 comedy short film that recreates scenes from early musical films, particularly The Broadway Melody.  The entire cast are trained dogs with human voiceovers. It was directed by Zion Myers and Jules White and it forms part of the MGM produced series of Dogville shorts.

This film is an extra feature in The Broadway Melody Special Edition DVD released in 2005.

Plot
The series of short films has an all-dog cast (with human voiceovers) that recreate famous scenes from early musical films, particularly The Broadway Melody. The finale is a chorus line of dogs performing "Singin' in the Rain" spoofing Cliff Edwards's original version of the song in The Hollywood Revue of 1929. Also spoofed is Al Jolson's performance of "Mammy" in The Jazz Singer. This was a part of MGM's popular series of Dogville Comedies shorts directed by Zion Myers and Jules White.

Cast
Zion Myers - (voice) (uncredited)
Jules White - (voice) (uncredited)

References

1930 films
American black-and-white films
1930s English-language films
Films directed by Jules White
1930 comedy films
Metro-Goldwyn-Mayer short films
1930 short films
American comedy short films
1930s American films